Nematopogon robertella is a moth of the family Adelidae. It is found in Europe.

Description
The wingspan is 14–16 mm.It is a brown-grey moth with long antennae. The dark wings have a clear mesh pattern just to the wing base and the head is not yellow. The antennae are wire-shaped and white, in the male about three times the length of the forewing, in the female about twice as long. The head is brownish, the body and the forewing are brownish grey. The forewing has clear mesh patterns on the entire wing surface, this is the best characteristic of the species. There is also a diffuse, bright spot at the tornus. The wingspans and hindwing are rather dark grey. The larva is white, slightly yellowish or reddish.

Similar species
Nematopogon magna
To certainly determine the species of the genus Nematopogon dissection and study of the genitalia is necessary.

Biology
The moth flies from late May to June depending on the location.

The larvae feed on bilberry.

References
Wagner-Rollinger, C. - Les Lepidopteres du Grand-Duche de Luxembourg (et des regions limitrophes) V. Tineoidea, Cossoidea, Incurvarioidea, Stigmelloidea, Hepialoidea, Eriocranioidea, Micropterygoidea. in Archives. Institut Grand-Ducal de Luxembourg, section des Sciences N.S. 36: 285-358. 1973
Wojtusiak, J. - Heliozelidae, Adelidae, Prodoxidae, Incurvariidae, Crinopterygidae. in In: *O. Karsholt & J. Razowski (Eds.), The Lepidoptera of Europe. A distributional checklist: 27-30, 300-301. 1996
Bolshakov, L. V. - New species of pyraloid moths from the Centre of European Russia (Lepidoptera: Pyraustidae). in Russian Entomological Journal 11(2): 225-228. 2002

External links

 waarneming.nl 
 Lepidoptera of Belgium 

Adelidae
Moths described in 1759
Moths of Japan
Moths of Europe
Moths of Asia
Taxa named by Carl Alexander Clerck